The 2011 Tri-Cities Fever season is the team's seventh season as a professional indoor football franchise and third in the Indoor Football League (IFL). One of twenty-two teams competing in the IFL for the 2011 season, the Kennewick, Washington-based Tri-Cities Fever are members of the Intense Conference.

Under the leadership of head coach Adam Shackleford, the team plays their home games at the Toyota Center in Kennewick, Washington.

The Fever lost to the Sioux Falls Storm 10-37 in the 2011 United Bowl.

Schedule
Key:

Preseason

Regular season

Standings

Roster

References

External links
Tri-Cities Fever official website
Tri-Cities Fever official statistics
Tri-Cities Fever at Tri-City Herald 

Tri-Cities Fever
Tri-Cities Fever seasons
Tri-Cities Fever